This is a list of multiplayer online battle arena games, sorted chronologically. Information regarding date of release, developer, platform, setting and notability is provided when available.

List

References

Timelines of video games
Multiplayer online battle arena